Langelier may refer to:

Places
 a former name of Québec (electoral district), a federal electoral district in Canada
 Langelier, Quebec, renamed to (the municipality of) La Croche in 1999
 Langelier (Montreal Metro), a station on the Montreal Metro (subway)
 33 Langelier, a bus route in Montreal
 Carrefour Langelier, a shopping mall in Montreal

Other uses
 Langelier (surname)
 Langelier Saturation Index, a measure of the calcium carbonate stability of water
 The Langoliers, a novella and miniseries written by Stephen King